E37 or E-37 may refer to:
 HMS E37, a 1916 British E class submarine
 European route E37, a series of roads in Germany
 E37, a version of the Mercedes-Benz M112 engine
 Nerima-kasugachō Station or E-37, a Tokyo Toei Ōedo Line railway station
 Nimzo-Indian Defence or E37, a chess opening
 East–West Link Expressway and Kuala Lumpur–Seremban Expressway, route E37 in Malaysia